Bestival Live 2011 is a live album recorded by The Cure during Bestival 2011 music festival in September 2011. It was first released in Germany on 2 December 2011, before being released in the UK on 5 December 2011.

All profits from the sale of the album go to the Isle of Wight Youth Trust.

Track listing

Disc 1
"Plainsong" – 5:10
"Open" – 6:53
"Fascination Street" – 4:58
"A Night Like This" – 4:10
"The End of the World" – 3:40
"Lovesong" – 3:35
"Just Like Heaven" – 3:47
"The Only One" – 4:14
"The Walk" – 3:31
"Push" – 4:37
"Friday I'm in Love" – 3:34
"In Between Days" – 2:58
"Play for Today" – 4:06
"A Forest" – 6:35
"Primary" – 4:20
"Shake Dog Shake" – 4:44

Disc 2
"The Hungry Ghost" – 4:48
"One Hundred Years" – 6:50
"End" – 6:11
"Disintegration" – 8:31
"Lullaby" – 4:43
"The Lovecats" – 3:50
"The Caterpillar" – 3:56
"Close to Me" – 3:37
"Hot Hot Hot!!!" – 3:34
"Let's Go to Bed" – 3:36
"Why Can't I Be You?" – 3:27
"Boys Don't Cry" – 3:05
"Jumping Someone Else's Train" – 3:11
"Grinding Halt" – 3:11
"10:15 Saturday Night" – 3:41
"Killing Another" – 3:37

Personnel
Robert Smith – vocals, guitar
Simon Gallup – bass guitar
Jason Cooper – drums
Roger O'Donnell – keyboard

References

External links
 

The Cure live albums
2011 live albums